Woman in a Dressing Gown is a 1957 British drama film directed by J. Lee Thompson and starring Yvonne Mitchell, Anthony Quayle, Sylvia Syms, and Carole Lesley. The film won four awards at the 7th Berlin International Film Festival including the first ever FIPRESCI Prize and a special mention for "Best Foreign Film". Mitchell won the Silver Bear for Best Actress.
The film also won the 1958 Golden Globe Award for Best English-Language Foreign Film.

The screenplay was written by Ted Willis and the cinematographer was Gilbert Taylor. The producer was Frank Godwin.

The film concerns a man who is having an extramarital affair and considers divorce, and his wife's reaction to the affair. Scenes compare and contrast the man's relationship with his wife versus his relationship with his lover. These are not only very different in content, but very different in film style, shots with his lover being in extreme close-up and/or unusually framed shots. Shots of the wife are mainly in wide angle, encompassing the chaotic mess of her house.

The film is considered an example of British social realism, and a prototypical version of Kitchen sink realism. Modern criticism has noted that it was more progressive in the field of gender politics than the British New Wave.

Plot
The Prestons are an apparently happy household made up of wife Amy (Yvonne Mitchell), husband Jim (Anthony Quayle) and teenage son Brian (Andrew Ray), living in a cramped flat on a London housing estate. On a Sunday morning she lovingly prepares his cooked breakfast but he announces he has to work.

However, tensions soon become clear. Though she has a breezy, loving character, Amy is a disorganised housewife. She finds it difficult to concentrate enough to tidy or cook properly. Jim is having an affair with a colleague, Georgie (Sylvia Syms), who threatens to break it off unless Jim divorces his wife and leaves his family. He promises that he will do so, and eventually demands a divorce. Amy is shocked and distraught, but vows to improve herself. She borrows ten shillings from her son (who is in his first job) and pawns her engagement ring for three pounds. She then gets her hair done and buys a half bottle of whisky for Jim. She has phoned Jim at work and told him to bring Georgie home. Her plan is foiled when heavy rain starts and ruins her new hair. She gets home looking worse than ever. She pulls her best dress out of storage but rips it putting it on. Her neighbour arrives and they start drinking the whisky. Amy gets drunk and ruins the table.

Brian finds her drunk and becomes angry with his father when he brings Georgie to the house. Jim slaps Brian, who leaves.

After a confrontation Amy orders Jim and Georgie out of the flat. Jim leaves, but has second thoughts, he tells Georgie it won't work and returns to his wife who is lovingly packing his case. She vows to get rid of her dressing gown.

Cast
 Yvonne Mitchell – Amy Preston
 Anthony Quayle – Jim Preston, Jimbo to his wife
 Sylvia Syms – Georgie Harlow
 Andrew Ray – Brian Preston (the teenage son)
 Carole Lesley – Hilda
 Michael Ripper – Pawnbroker
 Nora Gordon – Mrs. Williams
 Marianne Stone – Hairdresser
 Olga Lindo – Manageress
 Harry Locke – Wine merchant
 Max Butterfield – Harold
 Roberta Woolley – Christine
 Melvyn Hayes – Newsboy
 Cordelia Mitchell – Hilda's baby

Production
The film was based on a 1956 ITV Television Playhouse play written by Ted Willis. It was the first of three films Sylvia Syms made with Thompson.

Reception

Box Office
The film was one of the most popular at the British box office in 1957. According to Kinematograph Weekly the film was "in the money" at the British box office in 1957.

J. Lee Thompson later said the film lost money but was well received by critics.

Critical
Variety said it "had good b.o. possibilities."

The New York Times said "Paddy Chayefsky would love it."

Jean-Luc Godard wrote "One really has to rack one’s brains to find anything to say about a British  film. One wonders why. But that’s the way it is. And there isn’t even an  exception to prove the rule. Especially not Woman in a Dressing-gown anyhow, in spite of its acting prize? at the recent Berlin Festival. That just goes to show that the Germans have no idea either.... From beginning to end the film is an incredible debauch of camera movements as complex as they are silly and meaningless."

On the film's rerelease on in 2012, Peter Bradshaw, in a five star review for The Guardian wrote that the film's "proto-kitchen-sink drama goes all the way where Brief Encounter loitered hesitantly....and unlike David Lean's film, this one shows people saying the relevant things out loud. An unmissable rerelease." While Melanie Williams for the BFI Screenonline noted "an important reminder that postwar British realism did not begin with the New Wave, and that the 1950s were not devoid of socially engaged cinema, as is sometimes suggested. Indeed, in the field of gender politics, one could argue that this film is considerably more progressive than the New Wave that superseded it, in its focus on the travails of a middle-aged housewife rather than those of a virile young man."

Play
Willis later adapted the script into a stage play that was very successful.

References

Further reading
 Recent review on the occasion of the 2012 DVD release of a restored version of the film.
Williams, Melanie, 'Remembering the poor soul walking in the rain: Audience Responses to a Thwarted Makeover in Woman in a Dressing Gown' in Journal of British Cinema and Television, 10 (2013), pp. 709–726.
 Williams, Melanie, 'Dawn of the Kitchen Sink', Sight and Sound, August 2012, p. 22.
 Williams, Melanie, 'Twilight women of 1950s British cinema' in : The British Cinema Book. British Film Institute, 2009.
 Williams, Melanie, ‘Housewives’ choice’: Woman in a Dressing Gown' in British Cinema of the Fifties. MUP, 2003.

External links
 
Woman in a Dressing Gown at BFI Screenonline
Woman in a Dressing Gown at Letterbox DVD

1957 films
1957 drama films
British drama films
Films shot at Associated British Studios
British black-and-white films
Films about adultery in the United Kingdom
Films directed by J. Lee Thompson
Films with screenplays by Ted Willis, Baron Willis
Films set in London
Social realism in film
Films produced by J. Lee Thompson
1950s English-language films
1950s British films